Pyrus glabra, (referring to the seeds), is a species wild pear native to Iran. Preferring to grow in the Zagros Mountains at about 2000m above sea level, it is a small, spiny tree, typically 4.6m tall, reaching 7.8m. The plant was said to exude a sweet substance called manna of Luristan, which was collected by locals and consumed. Its fruit are heavy with tannins and very sour, but are still gathered in the wild for the vegetable oil in the seeds, which are larger than typical pear seeds. The oil keeps for a long time and is high in omega-6 fatty acids.

References

glabra
Endemic flora of Iran
Plants described in 1846